The First Cabinet of Napoleon I was appointed by the Emperor Napoleon I upon the establishment of the First French Empire on 18 May 1804, replacing the Cabinet of the Consulate. It was succeeded by the French Provisional Government of 1814 following the downfall of Napoleon and the abolition of the Empire.

Formation

At the session of the Tribunat on 3 Floréal year XII (23 April 1804) Jean-François Curée proposed that Napoleon, then First Consul, be declared hereditary Emperor of France.
The motion was supported by several members of the Tribunat, with only Lazare Carnot speaking against it.
At a session of the Senate on 28 Floréal year XII (18 May 1804) attended by Consul Charles-François Lebrun and all the ministers a motion was adopted in which Napoleon was declared hereditary Emperor of the French.
The formal coronation ceremony was delayed until 11 Frimaire year XIII (2 December 1804), when Pope Pius VII attended and Napoleon crowned himself  in the Notre Dame de Paris.

Ministers

Napoleon retained the ministers from the Consulate, but made various changes during his reign. 
He did not appoint a prime minister, but headed the government himself.
The ministers were:

Replacement

In March 1814 the allied armies invaded France, and arrived at the walls of Paris on 29 March 1814. After a short struggle on 30 March 1814 against overwhelmingly superior forces, on 31 March 1814 Marshal Marmont signed the capitulation of Paris.
A provisional government was formed on 1 April 1814 under the presidency of Charles Maurice de Talleyrand-Périgord.

References
Citations

Sources

French governments
1804 establishments in France
1814 disestablishments in France
Cabinets established in 1804
Cabinets disestablished in 1814
Napoleon